Gandolfo is a surname. Notable people with the surname include:

Antonino Gandolfo (1841–1910), Italian painter
Carlos Gandolfo (1931–2005), Argentine actor and theatre director
Emanuel Gandolfo (born 1968), Argentine stage magician
Giancarlo Gandolfo (born 1937), Italian economist
Mike Gandolfo (born 1958), American tennis player

See also
Gundulf